Masao Maruyama is the name of:

Masao Maruyama (Japanese Army officer) (1889–1957), commander in the Imperial Japanese Army during World War II
Masao Maruyama (scholar) (1914–1996), political theorist and historian
Masao Maruyama (film producer) (born 1941), producer for animation company Studio Madhouse